Dedo I, Count of Wettin (c. 950 – 13 November 1009), also known as Dedo I of Wettin, was a son of Theodoric I of Wettin and Jutta of Merseburg.

As a young man, Dedo spent his childhood with his relative Rikdag, Margrave of Meissen, Zeitz and Merseburg, and was thus closely related to one of the most influential men of East Saxony.  Dedo married, before 985, Thietburga, the daughter of Dietrich of Haldensleben, Margrave of the Nordmark.

In the years 974 to 985 Dedo I was involved in the rebellion of Duke Henry II of Bavaria against the Holy Roman Emperor Otto II and later against his son Otto III, until June 985, when the Bavarian Duke was finally subjugated in Frankfurt.

In 976 Dedo commanded a Bohemian army, conquered the March of Zeitz and robbed the Bishop's Church. It is alleged that he even took his own mother prisoner.

Dedo apparently had a good relationship with Archbishop Giselher of Magdeburg, who helped him gain comital rights in the northern Hassegau. Moreover, Dedo successfully claimed the Castle of Zörbig for himself and his brother Friedrich.

The years before Dedo's death were overshadowed by a feud with the Counts of Walbeck. When his father-in-law was deposed as the Margrave of the Nordmark, Dedo claimed the office of margrave for himself. The office was granted instead to Lothair, Count of Derlingau and Nordthüringgau. Lothair ruled the Nordmark from 983 to 1003.

Bishop Thietmar of Merseburg, Lothair's nephew, tells in his chronicle that Dedo I was involved in the devastation of the castle of Wolmirstedt which was in the possession of the Counts of Walbeck.  Dedo's dispute with the House of Walbeck continued with Lothair's son and successor Werner von Walbeck (1003–1009; died 1014). Dedo was killed by Werner on 13 November 1009 along with his vassals near Mose at the confluence of the Tange and Elbe rivers.

Dedo and Thietburga of Haldensleben had the following children:
 Theodoric II Count of Wettin, and from 1031 Margrave of Lusatia (c. 990–1034).

References

950s births
1009 deaths
Year of birth uncertain
House of Wettin